Tjalling "Tjallie" James (24 March 1906 – 9 February 1983) was a Dutch rower. He competed at the 1928 Summer Olympics in Amsterdam with the men's eight where they were eliminated in round two.

References

1906 births
1983 deaths
Dutch male rowers
Olympic rowers of the Netherlands
Rowers at the 1928 Summer Olympics
Sportspeople from Surabaya
European Rowing Championships medalists
20th-century Dutch people